Keith Gagnon (born December 31, 1987) is a Canadian ice dancer who competes with partner Tarrah Harvey. They are the 2009 Canadian junior silver medalists. They began skating together in June 1998.

Programs 
(with Harvey)

Competitive highlights 
(with Harvey)

References

External links 

 

Canadian male ice dancers
1987 births
Figure skaters from Vancouver
Living people
21st-century Canadian people